is a Japanese singer and voice actress affiliated with  Apollo Bay. She is best known for singing both ending themes to Star Twinkle PreCure, the sixteenth installment in Izumi Todo's Pretty Cure franchise.

Biography
Chihaya Yoshitake was born on 28 March 1999 in Hiroshima Prefecture. In 2017, She was the winner of the 2017 Anisong Stars Jury Special Award. In October 2018, she was selected as one of eight members of the "Voitama Project", and in 2019 started her activities in web content.
In 2019, she sang both ending songs of Star Twinkle PreCure, Papepipu Romantic and Oshiete! Twinkle. The former charted at #20 in the Oricon Singles Charts twelve days after its release, while the latter charted at #23 twelve days after its release. She also sang Seiza no Chikara for the series' movie.

Filmography

Television animation
2021
 Love Live! Superstar!!, Yūna Hijirisawa
2022
 Healer Girl, Sonia Yanagi
 Lucifer and the Biscuit Hammer, Subaru Hoshikawa

Video games
2020
 Sakura Kakumei: Hanasaku Otome-tachi, Tenka Keburai

Discography

References

External links
Official agency profile 

1999 births
Living people
21st-century Japanese women singers
21st-century Japanese singers
Musicians from Hiroshima Prefecture
Anime singers